CKXM-FM is a radio station that broadcasts an adult contemporary format on the frequency at 90.5 FM in Exeter, Ontario branded as 90.5 myFM.

Owned by My Broadcasting Corporation, the station was licensed on August 4, 2008.

In 2009, the station used Christmas music for on-air testing and signed on August 31, 2009.

References

External links
90.5 myFM
 

Kxm
Kxm
Radio stations established in 2008
2008 establishments in Ontario
KXM